Đurđa Fočić (born 28 July 1948) is a Croatian athlete. She competed in the women's pentathlon at the 1968, 1972 and the 1976 Summer Olympics, representing Yugoslavia.

References

1948 births
Living people
Athletes (track and field) at the 1968 Summer Olympics
Athletes (track and field) at the 1972 Summer Olympics
Athletes (track and field) at the 1976 Summer Olympics
Croatian pentathletes
Croatian female long jumpers
Olympic athletes of Yugoslavia
Sportspeople from Zagreb
Mediterranean Games silver medalists for Yugoslavia
Mediterranean Games medalists in athletics
Athletes (track and field) at the 1967 Mediterranean Games
Universiade silver medalists for Yugoslavia
Universiade medalists in athletics (track and field)